Kepler-28 is a star in the northern constellation of Cygnus., It is orbited by two exoplanets. It is located at the celestial coordinates: Right Ascension , Declination . With an apparent visual magnitude of 15.036, this star is too faint to be seen with the naked eye.

Planetary system
The two warm sub-Neptune gas giant planets of Kepler-28 were discovered in 2011 and were confirmed in early 2012.

References

Cygnus (constellation)
M-type main-sequence stars
870
Planetary transit variables
Planetary systems with two confirmed planets
J19283288+4225459